Tasinsky Bor is a rural locality (a settlement) in Posyolok Urshelsky, Gus-Khrustalny District, Vladimir Oblast, Russia. The population was 412 as of 2010. There are 9 streets.

Geography 
Tasinsky Bor is located 39 km west of Gus-Khrustalny (the district's administrative centre) by road. Vasilevo is the nearest rural locality.

References 

Rural localities in Gus-Khrustalny District